Kinyach is a settlement in Kenya's Baringo County.

See also 
 Lake Bogoria National Reserve

References 

Populated places in Baringo County